"Nothing I Can Do About It Now" is a song written by Beth Nielsen Chapman, and recorded by American country music artist Willie Nelson.  It was released in April 1989 as the first single from the album A Horse Called Music.  It was Nelson's fourteenth number one single on the U.S. Country Singles chart.  The single spent one week at number one and a total of fifteen weeks on the chart.

Chart performance

Year-end charts

References

1989 singles
1989 songs
Willie Nelson songs
Songs written by Beth Nielsen Chapman
Columbia Records singles